The President of the Assembly of Vojvodina presides over that body which serves as the unicameral parliament of the Autonomous Province of Vojvodina, within the Republic of Serbia.

Officeholders

Socialist Autonomous Province of Vojvodina
 Parties

Autonomous Province of Vojvodina

See also
List of local rulers of Vojvodina
President of the Presidency of SAP Vojvodina
President of the Government of Vojvodina

External links
Presidents of the Assembly of Vojvodina

Politics of Vojvodina
Vojvodina